Hills of Eternity Memorial Park, also known as Giboth Olam, is a Jewish cemetery founded in 1889, and is located at 1301 El Camino Real, in Colma, California. This cemetery is owned by Congregation Sherith Israel of San Francisco. It is one of four Jewish cemeteries near the city of San Francisco and it shares an adjacent space next to the Home of Peace cemetery (also a Jewish cemetery, and also founded in 1889). At Hills of Eternity Memorial Park, Jewish burials are traditionally done side-by-side, which means there is a need for larger grounds and ground maintenance.

History 

Emanu-El Hart (or the "Old Jewish Cemetery") was built in 1847 at Gough Street and Vallejo Street in San Francisco; by 1860 the graves were relocated to an area that is now Mission Dolores Park and this served as a cemetery for both the Congregation Emanu-El and the Congregation Sherith Israel. When the city of San Francisco started to see dramatic growth in population; it was decided to move the cemetery outside of the city to Colma and they established Home of Peace Cemetery and Hills of Eternity Memorial Park with each cemetery served a different congregation.

Notable burials 

 Jacob W. Davis (1831–1908), Russian Empire-born (now Latvia) American tailor, credited with inventing modern jeans.
 Josephine Earp (1861–1944), the common-law wife of Wyatt Earp.
 Wyatt Earp (1848–1929), gambler and Old West lawman.
 Phil Goldman (1964–2003), software engineer and entrepreneur, co-founded WebTV.
 Lionel Mark Jacobs (1840–1922), businessman and politician.
 Savely Kramarov (1934–1995), a Soviet-born Russian American actor.
 Isaac Magnin (1842–1907), Dutch-born American businessperson, carver and gilder. He was the co-founder of I. Magnin.
 Mary Ann Magnin (1850–1943), Dutch-born American businessperson, she was the co-founder of I. Magnin.
 Judith Graham Pool (1919–1975), doctor known for the discovery of cryoprecipitation.

See also 
 List of cemeteries in California
 Bereavement in Judaism

References 

Cemeteries in San Mateo County, California
Protected areas of San Mateo County, California
History of San Mateo County, California
1889 establishments in California
Jewish cemeteries in California